The Suffragette Oak is a Hungarian oak tree (Quercus frainetto) in Kelvingrove Park in Glasgow, planted in 1918. It was named Scotland's Tree of the Year in 2015.

History 
The tree was planted in Kelvingrove Park by Louisa Lumsden on behalf of suffrage organisations on 20 April 1918 to commemorate the right to vote being granted to some women in February 1918.

The Sunday Post reported on the event as follows:

Recent history 

In October 2017 the tree lost around 30 percent of its canopy during Storm Ophelia and suffered a large tear to its trunk.  To save the tree and protect the public, Glasgow City Council had to reduce its height and rebalance the canopy. The off-cuts were gifted to the Glasgow Women's Library to create items for sale that celebrate the efforts of the suffragettes. These subsequently became earrings, chopping boards, coasters, magnets and trinket boxes, made by local artist Annie Graham.

Recognition 
On International Women's Day in 1995, the Women's Committee of Glasgow City Council erected a  plaque next beside the tree which reads, ‘This oak tree was planted by Women's Suffrage Organisations in Glasgow on 20 April 1918 to commemorate the granting of votes to women.'

In 2015 the tree was named Scotland's Tree of the Year by the Woodland Trust after being nominated by Glasgow Women's Library. The award was presented to representatives from the Glasgow Women's Library at the Scottish Parliament in Edinburgh on 27 October 2015.

The Woodland Trust nominated the Suffragette Oak for the 2016 European Tree of the Year award.

Image gallery

See also
 List of individual trees

References 

Individual oak trees
Individual trees in Scotland
Tourist attractions in Glasgow
Landmarks in Scotland
Suffragettes
Women's suffrage in Scotland